Kyle Fogg (born January 27, 1990) is an American professional basketball player for the Liaoning Flying Leopards of the Chinese Basketball Association (CBA). He played college basketball for the Arizona Wildcats.

Professional career
After going undrafted in the 2012 NBA draft, Fogg joined the Houston Rockets for the 2012 NBA Summer League. On September 25, 2012, he signed with the Rockets, but was later waived on October 12. In November 2012, he was acquired by the Rio Grande Valley Vipers of the NBA Development League as an affiliate player.

On September 30, 2013, Fogg signed with the Denver Nuggets. However, he was later waived on October 16. In December 2013, he signed with Lapuan Korikobrat of Finland for the rest of the 2013–14 Korisliiga season, going on to earn league MVP honors after averaging 27.0 points and 6.4 rebounds in 29 games.

On June 11, 2014, Fogg signed with the Antwerp Giants of Belgium for the 2014–15 season.

In September 2015, Fogg signed with Eisbären Bremerhaven in Germany.

In June 2016, Fogg signed with Unicaja Málaga of the Spanish Liga ACB. In April 2017, Fogg won the EuroCup with Unicaja after beating Valencia BC in the Finals.

On July 4, 2017, Fogg signed with the Guangzhou Long-Lions of the Chinese Basketball Association. He re-signed with the team on July 2, 2018.

On August 15, 2019, Fogg signed with Beijing Royal Fighters, and left the team after the season.

In 2021, Fogg joined Liaoning Flying Leopards for the rest of the 2020–21 season, the signing was officially announced in April. He extended the contract with the team for the 2021–22 season.

The Basketball Tournament
Fogg joined the inaugural Overseas Elite roster for The Basketball Tournament (TBT) during the summer of 2015. Overseas Elite defeated Team 23 in the TBT 2015 championship game, 67–65, to claim the $1 million prize.

Overseas Elite and Fogg repeated as champions in August 2016, winning TBT 2016 with a 77–72 victory over Team Colorado, earning them another $2 million. In six games, Fogg averaged 21.8 points per game, and was subsequently named tournament MVP and a member of the All-Tournament team.

In August 2017, Fogg and Overseas Elite again returned as champions, winning TBT 2017 with an 86–83 victory over Team Challenge ALS, televised on ESPN. Fogg finished with a game-high 29 points, and received MVP and All-Tournament honors for the second straight year.

, Fogg and Overseas Elite won the TBT 2018.

Career statistics

College

|-
| style="text-align:left;"|2008–09
| style="text-align:left;"|Arizona
| 35 || 27 || 24.1 || .450 || .383 || .786 || 2.5 || 1.7 || 0.9 || 0.1 || 6.1
|-
| style="text-align:left;"|2009–10
| style="text-align:left;"|Arizona
| 31 || 24 || 28.8 || .415 || .417 || .755 || 3.1 || 2.2 || 0.9 || 0.3 || 11.1
|-
| style="text-align:left;"|2010–11
| style="text-align:left;"|Arizona
| 38 || 34 || 25.5 || .373 || .355 || .747 || 1.8 || 2.6 || 0.8 || 0.2 || 8.1
|-
| style="text-align:left;"|2011–12
| style="text-align:left;"|Arizona
| 35 || 34 || 32.1 || .420 || .444 || .789 || 3.7 || 2.2 || 1.1 || 0.4 || 13.5
|-
|- class="sortbottom"
| colspan="2" style="text-align:center;"|Career
| 139 || 119 || 27.5 || .411 || .404 || .771 || 2.8 || 2.2 || 0.9 || 0.2 || 9.6

G League

Regular season 

|-
| align="left" | 2012–13
| align="left" | Rio Grande
| 37 || 10 || 18.0 || .368 || .336 || .805 || 2.6 || 1.6 || 0.8 || 0.1 ||  6.4
|-
|- class="sortbottom"
| colspan="2" style="text-align:center;"|Career
| 37 || 10 || 18.0 || .368 || .336 || .805 || 2.6 || 1.6 || 0.8 || 0.1 ||  6.4
|}

Playoffs 

|-
| align="left" | 2012–13
| align="left" | Rio Grande
| 6 || 0 || 10.1 || .222 || .333 || .778 || 1.0 || 0.8 || 0.8 || 0.2 ||  2.2
|-
|- class="sortbottom"
| colspan="2" style="text-align:center;"|Career
| 6 || 0 || 10.1 || .222 || .333 || .778 || 1.0 || 0.8 || 0.8 || 0.2 ||  2.2
|}

Europe

European leagues

|-
| style="text-align:left;" | 2014–15 EuroChallenge
| style="text-align:left;" |  Antwerp Giants
| 12 || 12 || 31.9 || .446 || .438 || .755 || 3.2 || 2.8 || 0.9 || 0.2 || 16.4 || -
|-
| style="text-align:left;" | 2016–17 EuroCup
| style="text-align:left;" |  Unicaja Malaga
| 22 || 9 || 19.7 || .481 || .415 || .754 || 3.0 || 2.4 || 0.8 || 0.0 || 11.9 || -

Domestic leagues 

|-
| style="text-align:left;" | 2013-14
| style="text-align:left;" |  Kobrat
| style="text-align:left;" | Korisliiga
| 29 || 37.4 || .481 || .397 || .842 || 6.4 || 4.6 || 1.3 || 0.2 || 27.0
|-
| style="text-align:left;" | 2014-15
| style="text-align:left;" |  Antwerp Giants
| style="text-align:left;" | PBL
| 29 || 29.4 || .420 || .388 || .820 || 3.4 || 2.4 || 1.1 || 0.2 || 16.5
|-
| style="text-align:left;" | 2015-16
| style="text-align:left;" |  Bremerhaven
| style="text-align:left;" | Basketball Bundesliga
| 34 || 29.8 || .421 || .357 || .897 || 3.6 || 3.3 || 1.0 || 0.1 || 18.2
|-
| style="text-align:left;" | 2016-17
| style="text-align:left;" |  Unicaja Malaga
| style="text-align:left;" | ACB
| 32 || 16.1 || .471 || .447 || .849 || 2.4 || 2.2 || 0.8 || 0.1 || 10.2

Domestic Playoffs 

|-
| style="text-align:left;" | 2014-15
| style="text-align:left;" |  Antwerp Giants
| style="text-align:left;" | PBL
| 3 || 22.3 || .200 || .111 || .750 || 2.0 || 1.3 || 1.0 || 0.0 || 4.7
|-
| style="text-align:left;" | 2016-17
| style="text-align:left;" |  Unicaja Malaga
| style="text-align:left;" | ACB
| 5 || 11.6 || .333 || .333 || .750 || 1.2 || 1.4 || 0.4 || 0.0 || 4.0

CBA statistics

Regular season 

|-
| align="left" | 2017-18
| align="left" | Guangzhou
| 21 || 21 || 41.5 || .452 || .382 || .857 || 6.0 || 5.6 || 1.8 || 0.1 || 35.6
|-
| align="left" | 2018-19
| align="left" | Guangzhou
| 45 || 44 || 39.1 || .471 || .387 || .868 || 8.4 || 7.6 || 2.1 || 0.4 || 34.4
|-
| align="left" | 2019-20
| align="left" | Beijing
| 42 || 42 || 36.5 || .478 || .367 || .852 || 6.3 || 6.3 || 3.0 || 0.3 || 34.4
|-
| align="left" | 2020-21
| align="left" | Liaoning
| 5 || 0 || 19.8 || .472 || .435 || .921 || 3.8 || 5.8 || 2.0 || 0.2 || 19.0
|-
| align="left" | 2021-22
| align="left" | Liaoning
| 31 || 30 || 25.1 || .516 || .399 || .866 || 3.9 || 2.8 || 2.3 || 0.5 || 19.4
|-
| align="left" | 2022-23
| align="left" | Liaoning
| 27 || 27 || 31.0 || .461 || .389 || .836 || 5.9 || 4.2 || 2.0 || 0.7 || 23.5
|-
|- class="sortbottom"
| colspan="2" style="text-align:center;"|Career
| 171 || 164 || 34.3 || .473 || .384 || .859 || 6.2 || 5.5 || 2.3 || 0.4 || 27.8
|}

Playoffs 

|-
| align="left" | 2017-18
| align="left" | Guangzhou
| 2 || 2 || 44.0 || .467 || .476 || .800 || 3.5 || 6.0 || 2.0 || 0.0 || 38.0
|-
| align="left" | 2019-20
| align="left" | Beijing
| 2 || 2 || 39.5 || .426 || .063 || .879 || 4.5 || 7.0 || 4.0 || 0.5 || 35.0
|-
| align="left" | 2020-21
| align="left" | Liaoning
| 6 || 6 || 27.9 || .397 || .227 || .870 || 6.0 || 3.2 || 1.8 || 0.3 || 17.0
|-
| align="left" | 2021-22
| align="left" | Liaoning
| 9 || 9 || 19.8 || .511 || .333 || .759 || 3.0 || 1.1 || 1.6 || 0.3 || 13.8
|-
|- class="sortbottom"
| colspan="2" style="text-align:center;"|Career
| 19 || 19 || 26.8 || .456 || .294 || .835 || 4.1 || 2.9 || 1.9 || 0.3 || 19.6
|}
Source: basketball-stats.de (Date: 27. March 2022)

References

External links
 Arizona bio
 NBA D-League profile
 Eurobasket.com profile
 Kyle Fogg at basketball-stats.de

1990 births
Living people
American expatriate basketball people in Belgium
American expatriate basketball people in China
American expatriate basketball people in Finland
American expatriate basketball people in Germany
American expatriate basketball people in Spain
American men's basketball players
Antwerp Giants players
Arizona Wildcats men's basketball players
Baloncesto Málaga players
Basketball players from California
Eisbären Bremerhaven players
Guangzhou Loong Lions players
Kobrat players
Liga ACB players
People from Brea, California
Point guards
Rio Grande Valley Vipers players
Sportspeople from Orange County, California
United States men's national basketball team players